The Zhongzhou Yangtze River Bridge is a cable-stayed bridge over the Yangtze River in Zhong County of Chongqing, China. Completed in 2009, the bridge carries traffic on the G50 Shanghai–Chongqing Expressway.

The reservoir created by the Three Gorges Dam has increased the height of the water below the bridge and the clearance is reduced to  when the reservoir depth is at it peak.

See also
List of largest cable-stayed bridges
Yangtze River bridges and tunnels

External links
http://www.highestbridges.com/wiki/index.php?title=Zhongxian_Changjiang_Bridge

References

Bridges in Chongqing
Bridges over the Yangtze River
Cable-stayed bridges in China
Bridges completed in 2010